The Society of Saint Augustine (Societas Sancti Augustini), also known as the "Augustinians of Kansas" is a Roman Catholic Institute of Consecrated Life which takes as its pattern of living, the way of life delineated in the Rule of Saint Augustine of Hippo.  The community was founded on October 16, 1981 in Amarillo, Texas by four Augustinian Recollects (Friars from the Order of Augustinian Recollects). They were later joined later by two Augustinians; (Friars formerly from the Order of Saint Augustine.)  As an Augustinian community, The Society of Saint Augustine is composed of priests, religious brothers and lay people. It is rooted in the Augustinian Recollect tradition but differs somewhat from many other Augustinian Communities in that it places great emphasis on the inclusion and involvement of the laity (lay persons) in the life and ministry of the community.  Wherever a Community house is established, great emphasis is placed on extending Augustinian spirituality.  Lay "Affiliates" take part in Communal activities and regular formation. These "Affiliates" are invited to join the friars in Daily Offices, communal events—and even in the apostolate, where appropriate.   In turn, they extend Augustinian spirituality by their lives.

The members of the community are committed to living a traditional mendicant Augustinian Religious life, based on meditation / recollection, community prayer.  Members wear the traditional religious Habit consisting of a black (or White) mendicant tunic, black leather cincture, scapular and capuce.  Over this they wear a silver Augustinian Cross. Members may also wear the Rosary.  They celebrate the daily Divine Office or "Liturgy of the Hours"; practice a simplicity of life and are to be faithful to the Rule of Saint Augustine.  Drawing from the various reform movements in the Augustinian Tradition (the Spanish Recollection, The Observantine Congregation of the Augustinian Order, etc.,) the Society of Saint Augustine seeks to authentically adapt traditional Augustinian Religious Life to the contemporary needs of Society.

The community transferred to the Archdiocese of Kansas City in 1997 when it was invited by Archbishop James P. Keleher to minister in that diocese.  While fostering the "active/contemplative" dimension of Augustinian Religious Life, the Society of Augustine involves itself in a broad spectrum of ministries, including parochial and pastoral care, adult catechesis, Hispanic ministry, teaching, direction of retreats and military chaplaincy. The community also places great emphasis on "pro-life" issues.

Presently, this community of reform Friars has two houses:  Villa Saint Augustine, in Kansas City (which serves as the Administrative Center for the Community), and Villa Ostia, a retreat house in up-state New York.  In April 2009, Archbishop Joseph Naumann of Kansas City entrusted two parishes to their care:  Holy Family Parish, St. Mary-St. Anthony Parish.  (St. Anthony Parish had formerly been entrusted to Franciscan Friars who had left some time ago.)

The Religious Sisters 'affiliated' with the Society, while sharing in the charism of the community, are governed separately from the Friars.  Presently, the Augustinian Recollect Sisters of our Lady of Consolation, have one convent in Topeka, Kansas.

External links
 The Society of Saint Augustine S.S.A.

Mendicant orders
Augustinian orders
History of Catholic religious orders
Christian organizations established in 1981